Enfield Rolling Mills was a British manufacturer of non-ferrous metals.

The company was founded in 1924 as a private company, located on the River Lea in Enfield Lock near London. In 1933, it became a public company, and became known as 'Enfield Rolling Mills Ltd' (ERM).  Principal products were rolled aluminium, rolled copper, rolled zinc, and zinc cans.

During World War II, production increased greatly and continued to expand during the post-war years.

In 1959, ERM acquired Enfield Cables, and formed a joint venture with Standard Telephones and Cables, to create a new subsidiary specializing in manufacturing electric cables, Enfield Standard Power Cables Ltd.

In 1961, ERM formed a joint venture with Delta Metals Co, to create a new company Delta Enfield Rolled Metals. Two years later, in 1963, the Delta Group acquired all of ERM, thus forming one of the largest non-ferrous metal groups in Europe.

By 1980, Delta Enfield Rolled Metals was no longer competitive on world markets, and the factory closed.

References

Defunct manufacturing companies of the United Kingdom
History of the London Borough of Enfield
Manufacturing companies based in London
Manufacturing companies established in 1924
1913 establishments in England
1980 disestablishments in England